KCVJ (100.3 FM) is a radio station licensed to Osceola, Missouri, United States.  The station is an affiliate of Spirit FM, broadcasting a Christian Contemporary Music format with a few Christian talk and teaching programs, and is currently owned by Lake Area Educational Broadcasting Foundation.

History
The station was assigned the call letters KBUG on May 2, 1990.  On April 29, 1999, the station changed its call sign to the current KCVJ.

References

External links
 

CVJ